Robert S. Kiss (November 27, 1957 – November 5, 2021) was a Democratic politician from West Virginia. He was the 54th Speaker of the House for the West Virginia House of Delegates, a position he held from 1997 until 2007. In 2004, he announced that he would not be running for a tenth term in the House of Delegates, and would retire as speaker in 2006.

Kiss was first elected to the state legislature in 1988, as a delegate from the 27th district. In 1990, he was appointed vice-chairman of the Finance committee, and assumed the chairmanship the following term. In 1996, the state Democratic party nominated him to serve as Speaker of the House for the 73rd legislature, a position which he won. He currently is tied for the longest speakership in the history of West Virginia, beaten only by his predecessor.

On January 27, 2002, Kiss met with U.S. President George W. Bush. When the conversation turned to Kiss’ five-month-old twin sons, President Bush remarked "I've been to war. I've raised twins. If I had a choice, I'd rather go to war."

Kiss died of cancer, at age 63, on November 5, 2021.

References 

1957 births
2021 deaths
People from Raleigh County, West Virginia
American people of Hungarian descent
Speakers of the West Virginia House of Delegates
Democratic Party members of the West Virginia House of Delegates
21st-century American politicians